Max Brody (born Matthew Woods Brody, 1969) is an American musician based near Seattle, Washington, best known as the drummer/saxophonist for the industrial metal band Ministry from 1999 to 2004

Personal life 
Brody was born in the town of Elgin, Illinois, and was raised there until the age of five, when his family relocated to Scottsdale, Arizona. He started playing clarinet in the second grade, switching to saxophone as soon as he could reasonably hold one. By high school, he and his brother, Doug, were writing and recording jazzy, ambient, "new age" songs under the name "Mosaic" at their parents' house, which resulted in a series of recordings that were released in the mid- to late-1980s on the Invincible label in Phoenix, Arizona. They also made appearances on albums by other artists on that label. Brody later taught himself to play drums.

After his graduation from high school in 1987, Brody moved to Claremont, California, and graduated from Pomona College in 1991. Moving back and forth from Los Angeles to Seattle, he eventually settled on Austin, from where his favorite bands came.

He met his wife, Sherry, on the set of A.I.; she was an extra in the film. They married in 2004, in Arizona. They have one child named Isabella. Divorced in 2010, he now has full custody of his daughter and lives in Washington state.

Career 
After graduating from college, Brody moved to Seattle and played in local rock bands. Finding the Seattle scene saturated, he moved to Austin, Texas, in 1994. There, he met and became a musical partner of Rey Washam, the drummer for such seminal punk/hardcore acts as Rapeman, Scratch Acid and the Big Boys. They went on to form the short-lived Euripides Pants, which had a number of infamous Austin musicians. Washam later went on to drum for Ministry.

In late spring 1999, Brody received a call from a Ministry co-performer, Paul Barker, who offered him the opportunity to perform saxophone parts during their ill-fated Dark Side of the Spoon tour. He later went on to perform half of the drumming for their 2003 Animositisomina tour and album, as well as the follow-up Houses of the Molé.

He also appeared as the drummer for the Flesh Fair Band (a.k.a. Ministry) in the Kubrick/Spielberg (2001) film A.I..

Brody continued to work with Austin musicians like Brett Bradford (Scratch Acid), Jeff Pinkus (Butthole Surfers), Jason Craig (Pocket FishRmen), Jimbo Yongue (Daddy Longhead), Randy Turner (Big Boys), Paul Barker (Ministry), Mike Scaccia (Ministry) Danny Barnes (Bad Livers) and John Hawkins (Crust), and with Seattle musicians Chris Ballew (Presidents of the United States of America) and Tad Doyle (TAD) as well as the New York musicians Victor Poison-tete (Rat At Rat R), Stu Spasm (Lubricated Goat), the Italian conceptual artist Daniele Santaguiliana (Testing Vault),the  Swedish guitar player Tobias Eriksson (Light Screamer/Daisy Pusher), the Los Angeles music supervisor Jeff Kinart and others in many different music projects. 

Having learned a great deal about production during his years in Ministry while expanding the number of instruments he plays, he began to produce records and events on his own, and started a multimedia company called Darkstack with the Austin visual artist D Kithcart. In 2012, he moved to Shoreline, Washington, with his daughter. From 2013 to 2018, he had a band with Danny Barnes (formerly of the Bad Livers) called the Test Apes. He continues to release solo projects through Bandcamp.

Ministry
Pink Anvil
Areola 51
Insect Sex Act
Naugahyde Dream Sequence
Sangre de Toro
Ye Olde Castletons
Goobersmoochers
Taxi Crab Nebula
Euripides Pants
Shit Sherlock
Creepy Stick
Test Apes
Masquerade As Angels
Notorious Early Procedures
Smedley's Racket

Personal discography
Mosaic, "Landscapes" (1985, self-released)
Doug and Matt Brody, "Form and Illusion" (Invincible, 1986)
Mosaic, "New Blue" (Invincible, 1987)
Mosaic, "Invisible Landscapes" (Invincible, 1988)
Various Artists, "The Incredible Invincible Sampler, 1989)
Singh Kaur and Mosaic, "Crimson Series:  Blessings" (Invincible, 1991)
Various Artists, It Came Frumunda (1993, self-released)
Euripedes Pants, Way Up Off In There (1996, Sweatbox)
Sangre de Toro, Hold Yer Breath (1998, self-released)
Various Artists, Bands That Begin With the Letter "S" (1999, Sweatbox)
Sangre de Toro, El Pee (2000, self-released)
Various Artists, Diggy Diggy Die (2000, Rubble)
Various Artists, Diggy Diggy Dead (2005, Rubble)
Ministry, Greatest Fits (2001, Warner)
Ye Olde Castletons, In Like With Love (2001, Kranzke)
Goobersmoochers, Goobersmoochers I (2002, self-released)
Ministry, Animositisomina (2003, Sanctuary)
Taxi Crab Nebula, s/t (2003, self-released)
Naugahyde Dream Sequence, s/t (2003, self-released)
Pink Anvil, Halloween Party (2003, Ipecac)
Ministry, Houses of the Molé (2004, Sanctuary)
Areola 51, Self Tittled (2004, Stacked)
Insect Sex Act, Act 1 (2006, Stacked)
Max Brody, Passout EP (2007, Stacked)
Max Brody, Brody-Spasm-Tete Encounter (2007, self-released) 
Shit Sherlock, The Ballad of St. Crespi (2010, self-released)
Pink Anvil, New Years Eve Party (2008, self-released)
Suffer Robot, Suffer Robot (2007, self-released)
Areola 51, The Double-D Sides, (2009, Stacked)
Shit Sherlock, Hans Pretzilrod (2011, self-released)
Goobersmoochers, Still Life With Goobers (2014, self-released)
Goobersmoochers, Mischief  (2014, self-released)
Pink Anvil, Cubed (2015, self-released)
Max Brody, Guilty Pleasure, Vol.1  (2012, self-released)
Max Brody, Smitty (2012, self-released)
Smedley's Racket, Smedley's Racket (2014, self-released)
Test Apes, Test Apes (2014, Festive Duds Music)
Test Apes, Stranded On Earth (2015, Festive Duds Music)
Test Apes, Mystery Tool (2015, Festive Duds Music)
Test Apes, Remotes (2016, Festive Duds Music)
Max Brody, Couchlock (2016, self-released)
Notorious Early Procedures, ...We Walked Into God's Chest Howling (2016, self-released)
Goobersmoochers, Left On Piedmont (2016, self-released)
Test Apes, Chicken Pie Vortex (2017, Festive Duds Music)
Max Brody, High Strangeness In Stereophonic Sound (2017, self-released)
Goobersmoochers, "Too Big To Flush" (2017, self-released)
Smedley's Racket, "Never Letting A Good Crisis Go To Waste" (2017, self-released)
Creepy Stick, "Velveteen Straightjacket" (2017, self-released)
Test Apes, "They Came In Peace" (2018, self-released)
Creepy Stick, "Wooden Jello Boots" (2018, self-released)
Max Brody, "Plagueground" (2018, self-released)
Max Brody, "49 & 3/4" (2019, self-released)
Max Brody and Tobias Eriksson, "Crestless Trough" (2019, self-released)
Max Brody, "Pineapple Foghorn" (2020, self-released)
Max Brody, "Space Flotilla" (2021, self-released)
Max Brody, "Self Untitled" (2021, self-released)
Max Brody, "The Vacuum of Spaced" (2021, self-released)
Max Brody, "Wishing You A Happy Bullstar" (2022, self-released)
Max Brody, "Cosmo EP" (2022, self-released)

References

External links
 Official web site for Max Brody
 Max Brody's official page on Bandcamp
 Alternative Nation interview

American rock musicians
Ministry (band) members
Pomona College alumni
1969 births
Living people